The Litkenhous Difference by Score Ratings system was a mathematical system used to rank football and basketball teams. The Litrating system was developed by Vanderbilt University professor Dr. Edward E. Litkenhous (1907 – December 22, 1984) and his brother Francis H. Litkenhous (December 9, 1912 – June 22, 1996).

The NCAA college football records book includes the Litkenhous Ratings as a "major selector" of college football national championships for the years 1934-1984.

National champions

Teams in the following table were ranked No. 1 by the Litkenhous Difference by Score Ratings system.

The NCAA records book credits Litkenhous as a "major selector" for the active seasons 1934–1984, and credits the system with 51 total rankings. However no selections are listed in the NCAA records book for the 6 years 1973, 1975, 1976, 1977, 1979, and 1980.

† Years where Litkenhous selection is omitted from the NCAA records book.

Litkenhous trophy

The No. 1 team in the year's final ranking was awarded the Litkenhous Ratings Championship trophy. The traveling trophy took the form of a huge wooden plaque and bronze mural by artist Marion Junkin.

Further reading

The Mysterious Dr. Litkenhous

References

College sports rankings in the United States